The structure of the Pakistan Army is based on two distinct themes: operational and administrative. Operationally the Pakistan Army is divided into nine corps and three corps-level formations with areas of responsibility (AOR) ranging from the mountainous regions of the north to the desert and coastal regions of the south. Administratively it is divided in several regiments (details below). The General Headquarters (GHQ) of the Army is located in Rawalpindi in Punjab province. It is planned to be moved to the capital city of Islamabad nearby.

Army headquarters and staff

The Chief of the Army Staff (COAS), formerly called the Commander-in-Chief (C-in-C of the Pakistan Army), is challenged with the responsibility of commanding the Pakistan Army. The COAS operates from army headquarters in Rawalpindi, near Islamabad. The Principal Staff Officers (PSO's) assisting him in his duties at the lieutenant general level include:

The Military Operations and Intelligence Directorates function under the Chief of General Staff (CGS). A major reorganization in GHQ was done in September 2008 under General Ashfaq Parvez Kayani, when two new PSO positions were introduced: the Inspector General Arms and the Inspector General Communications and IT, thus raising the number of PSO's to eight.

The headquarters function also includes the Judge Advocate General (JAG), and the Controller of Civilian Personnel, the Chief of the Corps of Engineers (E-in-C) who is also head of Military Engineering Service (MES), all of them also report to the Chief of the Army Staff.

Operational structure

Hierarchy

Corps
There are nine corps (each including an independent signals brigade) and three corps-level formations (Air Defence 
Aviation and Strategic Forces).

Former formations
Eastern Command was a Corps level formation in the former East Pakistan consisting of 9, 14 and 16 Infantry Divisions, these three divisions were re-raised after the 1971 war and still exist today.

36 adhoc Div. and 39 adhoc Div. were raised to command the Paramilitary troops and a few loyal battalions. Were later reinforced with a couple of other battalions each. They were not re-raised after the war.

Administrative structure
The Pakistan Army is organised in two main ways, which are Arms and Services.

Regiments

References

Pakistan Army